Intersindical Región Murciana is a union in the Region of Murcia, Spain that brings together workers from the fields of education, public services and rail.

It was formed as a federation of unions in 2002 from the confluence of two unions: Sterm (Union of Education Workers of the Murcia Region belonging to the Confederation of Teachers' Unions and Intersindical Servicios Publicos (Union of workers of the public services of the Murcia Region), later incorporating the territorial organization of the Rail Union - Intersindical in the Murcia Region.

Implantation 
In the period 2016 - 2018 Intersindical Región Murciana had a 14% union representation in the administration of the Autonomous Community of the Region of Murcia. Currently (2019) has 18 union delegates.

References

External links
 Web page Intersindical Region Murciana
 Web page STERM - Intersindical
 Web page Intersindical - Servicios Públicos
 Web page Organización de Mujeres - Intersindical
 Sindicato Ferroviario - Intersindical

Trade unions in Spain